Darius Jones (born May 3, 1978) is an American jazz alto saxophonist and composer.

Life and career
Darius was born in Virginia. He was raised in the Pentecostal faith; both his grandfathers were preachers in their own churches. He learned to play saxophone in the sixth grade; he played in church by the time he was 13. After attending college for several years in Richmond, Virginia, Jones moved to Brooklyn in 2005. Through a neighbor, Jones met artist Randal Wilcox and they became roommates. A conversation started between musician and painter that led to Jones's Man'ish Boy series.

In 2009 signed with  AUM Fidelity, which released his debut album Man'ish Boy (A Raw and Beautiful Thing). He recorded with Matthew Shipp, the quartet Grass Roots, and the collective Little Women, a noise jazz band that explores the extremes of sound by using extended techniques and acoustic manipulation. Jones has worked in traditional jazz, electro-acoustic music, chamber ensembles, contemporary and avant-garde jazz groups, modern dance performances, and multi-media events.

Discography

As leader/co-leader

As sideman

References

External links
Official site
Darius Jones: From Johnny Hodges to Noise Jazz at All About Jazz 
All Music Guide list of recording credits
New York Jazz Workshop Faculty

American jazz saxophonists
American male saxophonists
1978 births
Living people
Place of birth missing (living people)
Virginia Commonwealth University alumni
New York University alumni
21st-century American saxophonists
Jazz musicians from Virginia
21st-century American male musicians
American male jazz musicians
AUM Fidelity artists